Events during the year 1924 in  Northern Ireland.

Incumbents
 Governor - 	 The Duke of Abercorn 
 Prime Minister - James Craig

Events
24 March – Ballycastle Railway closes due to financial difficulties.
24 April – No agreement is reached at the Boundary Conference in London. The Irish Boundary Commission is now set up to examine the border between the Irish Free State and Northern Ireland.
6 May – James Craig refuses to nominate a Northern Ireland representative to the Boundary Commission.
11 August – Ballycastle Railway reopens under Northern Counties Committee ownership.
14 September – First BBC broadcast from Belfast (station 2BE).
24 October – Éamon de Valera is arrested at Newry Town Hall after defying an order preventing him from speaking in Northern Ireland.

Arts and literature

Sport

Football
International
1 March Scotland 2 - 0 Northern Ireland (in Glasgow)
15 March Northern Ireland 0 - 1 Wales
22 October England 3 - 1 Northern Ireland (in Liverpool)

Irish League
Winners: Queen's Island

Irish Cup
Winners: Queen's Island 1 - 0 Willowfield

Births
12 January – Arthur Armstrong, painter (died 1996).
15 April – Padraic Fiacc, poet.
18 April – Roy Mason, fourth Secretary of State for Northern Ireland.
26 May – Sheelagh Murnaghan, only Ulster Liberal Party Member of Parliament at Stormont (died 1993).
11 July – Charlie Tully, footballer (died 1971).
2 December – William Craig, former Unionist MP and founder of the Ulster Vanguard movement.
14 December – Andy Thompson, Canadian politician.
17 December – Cecil Walker, Ulster Unionist Party MP for North Belfast from 1983 to 2001 (died 2007).
Full date unknown
Max Clendinning, architect and interior designer.
Kennedy Lindsay, Vanguard Progressive Unionist Party politician and British Ulster Dominion Party leader (died 1997) (born in Canada).

Deaths
6 June – William Pirrie, 1st Viscount Pirrie, shipbuilder and businessman (born 1847).
Full date unknown - Anne Marjorie Robinson, artist (born 1858).

See also
1924 in Scotland
1924 in Wales

References